The Lago di Ogliastro is an artificial lake in the province of Enna and the province of Catania, Sicily, Italy. Its waters come from the river Gornalunga.

Lakes of Sicily